Denholm is a village in the Borders region of Scotland.

Denholm may also refer to:

Places
 Denholm, Quebec, a municipality in Canada
 Denholm, Saskatchewan, a village in Canada
 Mount Denholm, a mountain in Antarctica

People
 Denholm (surname)
 Denholm Elliott (1922-1992), English actor
 Alexander Denholm Brash (1874-1943), British bookseller, stationer and postcard publisher
 George Denholm Armour (1864-1949), British painter and illustrator
 Noel Denholm Davis (1876-1950), English artist
 Robert "Bobby" Denholm Baxter (1911-1991), Scottish footballer best known for his time with English club Middlesbrough
 William Denholm Barnetson (1917-1981), British newspaper proprietor and television executive
 William Denholm Kennedy (1813-1865), Scottish historical, genre and landscape painter

Other uses
 Denholm Group, a British maritime company based in Glasgow, United Kingdom

See also
 Dänholm, a small island on the German coast of the Baltic Sea
 Denholm & McKay (Denholm's), a former department store located in Worcester, Massachusetts
 Denholme, a town and civil parish in the Bradford Metropolitan Borough, West Yorkshire, England
 Hawick and Denholm (ward), an electoral division in the Scottish Borders Council
 Serco Denholm, a joint venture between Serco Group and Denholm Group